Asparuhovo may refer to:

Asparuhovo, Burgas Province, a village in Bulgaria
Asparuhovo, Montana Province, a village in Bulgaria
Asparuhovo, Varna, a district of Varna, Bulgaria
Asparuhovo Bridge, Varna, Bulgaria